Michael Chaput (born April 9, 1992) is a Canadian professional ice hockey player who is currently under contract to Barys Astana of the Kontinental Hockey League (KHL). Chaput was selected by the Philadelphia Flyers in the 3rd round (89th overall) of the 2010 NHL Entry Draft.

Playing career
As a youth, Chaput played in the 2004 Quebec International Pee-Wee Hockey Tournament with a minor ice hockey team from Deux-Rives.

Chaput played four seasons (2008-2012) of junior hockey in the Quebec Major Junior Hockey League (QMJHL) with the Lewiston Maineiacs and Shawinigan Cataractes, scoring 77 goals and 110 assists for 187 points, while earning 238 penalty minutes, in 216 games played. He was awarded the Stafford Smythe Memorial Trophy as the most valuable player in the 2012 Memorial Cup.

On February 28, 2011, the Philadelphia Flyers traded Chaput to the Columbus Blue Jackets (along with Greg Moore) in exchange for Tom Sestito, and on April 28, 2012, the Blue Jackets signed Chaput to a three-year entry level contract.

At the conclusion of his entry-level contract with the Blue Jackets, Chaput was not tendered a qualifying offer and was released as a free agent. On the opening day of free agency on July 1, 2016, Chaput was signed to a one-year, two-way deal with the Vancouver Canucks. The Canucks assigned Chaput their AHL affiliate, the Utica Comets to start the 2016–17 season but recalled him on November 7, 2016. On February 12, 2017, he scored two goals to help the Canucks defeat the Buffalo Sabres by a score of 4–2 for his first career multi-goal game.

On June 24, 2018, as an impending restricted free agent, the Canucks traded Chaput to the Chicago Blackhawks, in exchange for Tanner Kero. On the following day, Chaput was not tendered a qualifying offer by the Blackhawks and was released to explore free agency.

On July 1, 2018, Chaput was signed to a two-year, two-way contract with the Montreal Canadiens. He started the 2018–19 season with their American Hockey League affiliate, the Laval Rocket, but was called up on November 20, 2018 after having notched 10 points in 18 AHL games. Chaput drew into the Canadiens line-up on the fourth-line, contributing 5 assists in 32 games before he was placed on waivers and returned to the AHL. On February 25, 2019, Chaput was traded by the Canadiens to the Arizona Coyotes in exchange for Jordan Weal.

He played parts of three seasons within the Coyotes organization, before leaving as a free agent following the  campaign. On July 29, 2021, Chaput was signed to a one-year, two-way contract with the Pittsburgh Penguins.

Following 10 professional seasons in North America, Chaput as a free agent signed his first contract abroad in agreeing to a one-year contract with Kazakh based club, Barys Astana of the KHL, on September 25, 2022.

Personal life
His older brother, Stefan Chaput, formerly played professionally in the American Hockey League, and his father, Alain, once served as governor for the now-defunct Lewiston Maineiacs franchise.

Career statistics

Awards and honours

References

External links

1992 births
Living people
Arizona Coyotes players
Barys Nur-Sultan players
Canadian ice hockey centres
Columbus Blue Jackets players
Lake Erie Monsters players
Laval Rocket players
Lewiston Maineiacs players
Montreal Canadiens players
Philadelphia Flyers draft picks
Shawinigan Cataractes players
Ice hockey people from Montreal
Springfield Falcons players
Tucson Roadrunners players
Utica Comets players
Vancouver Canucks players
Wilkes-Barre/Scranton Penguins players